Eyes and Ears of God: Video Surveillance of Sudan is a 2012 documentary film by Tomo Križnar and Maja Weiss.

It shows the ethnic Nuba civilians defending themselves with the help of over 400 cameras distributed by himself and Klemen Mihelič, the founder of humanitarian organisation H.O.P.E., to volunteers across the war zones in the Nuba Mountains, Blue Nile, and Darfur, documenting the (North) Sudan military's war crimes against local populations.

See also 
 Sri Lanka's Killing Fields, a 2011 documentary film
 Darfur Now, a 2007 documentary film
 Nuba Conversations, a 2000 documentary film

References

External links
 Tomo Kriznar - official website
 Dodging Bombers in Sudan, 22 February, 2012 report from The New York Times columnist Nicholas D. Kristof

2012 films
Documentary films alleging war crimes
Documentary films about the War in Darfur
Internet documentary films
2012 YouTube videos
Documentary films about citizen media
2012 documentary films
Slovenian documentary films